Kostolné is a village and municipality in Myjava District in the Trenčín Region of western Slovakia.

History
In historical records the village was first mentioned in 1392.

Geography
The municipality lies at an altitude of 219 metres and covers an area of 10.109 km². It has a population of about 640 people.

Genealogical resources

The records for genealogical research are available at the state archive "Statny Archiv in Bratislava, Slovakia"

 Lutheran church records (births/marriages/deaths): 1784-1924 (parish A)

See also
 List of municipalities and towns in Slovakia

References

External links
 
 
https://web.archive.org/web/20090412234949/http://www.statistics.sk/mosmis/eng/run.html
Surnames of living people in Kostolne

Villages and municipalities in Myjava District